Calophyllum neoebudicum is a species of tree in the Calophyllaceae family. It is found in American Samoa, Fiji, Indonesia, Papua New Guinea, Samoa, the Solomon Islands, Tonga, and Vanuatu.

References

neoebudicum
Flora of the Southwestern Pacific
Trees of Malesia
Trees of Papuasia
Trees of the Pacific
Least concern plants
Taxonomy articles created by Polbot
Taxobox binomials not recognized by IUCN